MGM Grand is a casino and hospitality brand owned by MGM Resorts International (formerly MGM Grand, Inc.). It may refer to:

Hotels and casinos

MGM Grand Las Vegas, the current MGM Grand in Las Vegas
MGM Grand Garden Arena
MGM Grand Adventures Theme Park
Horseshoe Las Vegas, a property previously named the MGM Grand Hotel and Casino from 1973 to 1985
MGM Grand fire, a major disaster that occurred at that hotel in 1980
MGM Grand Darwin, Northern Territory, Australia, now Skycity Darwin
MGM Grand Detroit, Michigan
MGM Grand at Foxwoods, now The Fox Tower, Connecticut
MGM Grand Macau, China, now MGM Macau
MGM Grand Reno, Nevada, now Grand Sierra Resort
MGM Grand Sanya, a property of MGM Resorts International in China

Other uses
MGM Grand Air, later Champion Air, the former MGM Grand in-house airline
"MGM Grand" (song), a 2000 rock single by Grandaddy